Vicia nana is a flowering plant species in the genus Vicia found in South America.

References

External links

nana
Flora of South America
Plants described in 1839